Richard Orson Lockridge (September 26, 1898 in St. Joseph, Missouri – June 19, 1982 in Tryon, North Carolina) was an American writer of detective fiction.  Richard Lockridge with his wife Frances created one of the most famous American mystery series, Mr. and Mrs. North.

Early life

Lockridge was born in St. Joseph, Missouri, and was educated at the University of Missouri.  After serving in the United States Navy, he returned to Missouri, working as a reporter on the Kansas City Kansan and the Kansas City Star.  In 1922, he married fellow reporter Frances Louise Davis.  The couple soon moved to New York, where Lockridge joined the old New York Sun.  In 1932, Lockridge published his first book, Darling of Misfortune:  Edwin Booth:  1833–1893.

Mr. and Mrs. North series

In 1937, Frances Lockridge conceived the plot for a detective novel, but had problems with her characters.  Richard Lockridge collaborated with his wife, using her plot and the characters he had created earlier for a series of comic sketches in The New Yorker, Mr. and Mrs. North (named for the "stupid people who played the north hand in bridge problems," according to Lockridge).  The book was published in 1940 as The Norths Meet Murder, launching a series of twenty-six novels, which was adapted for the stage, film, radio, and television.

 
 Mr. and Mrs. North (1936)
 The Norths Meet Murder (1940)
 Murder Out of Turn (1941)
 A Pinch of Poison (1941)
 Death on the Aisle (1942)
 Death Takes a Bow (1943)
 Hanged for a Sheep (1944)
 Killing the Goose (1944)
 Payoff for the Banker (1945)
 Death of a Tall Man (1946)
 Murder Within Murder (1946)
 Untidy Murder (1947)
 Murder Is Served (1948)
 The Dishonest Murderer (1949)
 Murder in a Hurry (1950)
 Murder Comes First (1951)
 Dead as a Dinosaur (1952)
 Death Has a Small Voice (1953)
 Curtain for a Jester (1953)
 A Key for Death (1954)
 Death of an Angel (1955)
 Voyage into Violence (1956)
 The Long Skeleton (1958)
 Murder is Suggested (1959)
 The Judge is Reversed (1960)
 Murder Has Its Points (1961)
 Murder by the Book (1963)

Lt. Heimrich series

In the second Mr. and Mrs. North novel, Murder Out of Turn (1941), the couple and their New York City homicide detective friend, Lt. Bill Weigand, encounter murder out of town, near Brewster, New York.  There they meet an officer of the New York State Bureau of Criminal Identification (referred to in some later books as the Bureau of Criminal Investigation), Lt. Heimrich (in later books given the first name Merton, and achieving promotion to Captain).  Heimrich also guest-starred in a 1946 Mr. and Mrs. North book, Death of a Tall Man, before becoming the star of his own series of twenty-two novels, beginning with Think of Death (1947).

 
 I Want to Go Home (1948)
 Spin Your Web, Lady (1949)
 Foggy, Foggy Death (1950)
 A Client is Cancelled (1951)
 Death by Association (1952)
 Stand Up and Die (1953)
 Death and the Gentle Bull (1954)
 Burnt Offering (1955)
 Let Dead Enough Alone (1956)
 Practice to Deceive (1957)
 Accent on Murder (1958)
 Show Red for Danger (1960)

 With One Stone (1961)
 First Come, First Kill (1962)
 The Distant Clue (1963)
 Murder Can't Wait (1964)
 Murder Roundabout (1966)
 With Option to Die (1967)
 A Risky Way to Kill (1969)
 Inspector's Holiday (1971)
 Not I, Said the Sparrow (1973)
 Dead Run (1976)
 The Tenth Life (1977)

Nathan Shapiro series

Richard and Frances Lockridge began a third detective series with The Faceless Adversary (1956), featuring New York City Police detective, Nathan Shapiro.  Shapiro was a sad-sack of a detective, who always assumed some other detective would be more skilful or more insightful. He always thinks that the promotions he receives are undeserved. People he encounters wonder what makes him appear to be so depressed.  Eventually, the Shapiro series ran to ten books, including the last novel Lockridge published, The Old Die Young (1980); Shapiro also appeared in one Heimrich novel, Murder Can't Wait (1964).

 
 The Faceless Adversary (1956)
 Murder and Blueberry Pie (1959)
 The Tangled Cord (1960)
 The Drill Is Death (1961)
 Murder for Art's Sake (1967)
 Die Laughing (1969)

 Preach No More (1971)
 Write Murder Down (1972)
 Or Was He Pushed? (1975)
 A Streak of Light (1976)
 The Old Die Young (1980)

Paul Lane series

Richard and Frances Lockridge began a fourth detective series with Night of the Shadows (1962), a police procedural featuring a New York City Police detective, Paul Lane.  Lane was the main character in Quest for the Bogeyman (1964), and then he and partner Sgt., then later Lt., John Stein, were prominently featured in the six novels focused on New York County assistant district attorney Bernard Simmons that followed that character's first appearance, in And Left for Dead (1962). (The novels featuring the interplay and occasional conflicts between ADA Bernie Simmons and Lane and Stein prefigures the Law & Order television series.)

Lockridge's various series books take place in a shared universe.  The Lt. Heimrich series was a spin-off of the Mr. and Mrs. North series.  A retired college professor who first assists Heimrich with a case in Accent on Murder (1958) and again in Murder Can't Wait (1964)—a book that also features the meeting of Nathan Shapiro and Merton Heimrich—shows up to help ADA Bernie Simmons in Twice Retired (1970).  Bill Weigand, who as a homicide lieutenant was the police friend of Mr. and Mrs. North throughout their series, is referred to occasionally as the division captain in the Paul Lane book.  Lane's partner, Johnny Stein, is presumably the Sgt. Stein (no first name) who assisted Bill Weigand in the Mr. and Mrs. North novels.  All the books make frequent use of real New York landmarks, such as the Charles French Restaurant in Greenwich Village, as well as share several fictional landmarks, such as "Dyckman University."

Personal and professional life

In 1960, Richard and Frances Lockridge were co-presidents of the Mystery Writers of America.  They received a special Edgar Award in 1962.  Richard Lockridge had received an Edgar in 1945 for best radio play.

Frances Lockridge, born 10th January 1896, died on 19th February 1963.  In 1965, Richard Lockridge married Hildegarde Dolson, a New York freelance writer.  Richard Lockridge continued to write Lt. Heimrich, Nathan Shapiro, and Paul Lane novels, as well as non-series mystery novels, but he wrote no Mr. and Mrs. North novels after Frances's death.  Lockridge also wrote an espionage novel with George Hoben Estabrooks, Death in the Mind (1945), and two non-mystery novels, The Empty Day (1965) and Encounter in Key West (1966).  He co-authored Michael J. McKeogh's memoir of World War II, Sgt. Mickey and General Ike (1946).  With his first wife, Lockridge wrote three short non-fiction books about cats.  He wrote a memoir of his courtship of his second wife, Hildegarde Dolson, in One Lady, Two Cats (1967).

He died in 1982 after a series of strokes.

Richard Lockridge once described his and Frances Lockridge's collaboration:  "We had story conferences, and wrote a summary.  As we both insisted, the writing was entirely mine."  William DeAndrea notes, "The contribution made by Frances, he said in the same interview, might amount to five pages of plot, which he would then turn into a 200-page manuscript." The Lockridges by-lined their Mr. and Mrs. North books as "Frances and Richard Lockridge"; the Lt. Heimrich books were by-lined as "Richard and Frances Lockridge."

References
 William L. DeAndrea (1994). Encyclopedia Mysteriosa. Prentice Hall

External links
 Finding aid to Richard Lockridge papers at Columbia University. Rare Book & Manuscript Library.

1898 births
1982 deaths
United States Navy sailors
The New York Sun people
University of Missouri alumni
Novelists from Missouri
American mystery writers
American male novelists
20th-century American novelists
20th-century American male writers
Novelists from New York (state)